Poyle Estate Halt railway station was opened by the Western Region of British Railways on 4 January 1954 between  and  on the Staines West Line. It closed to passengers on 29 March 1965. No relic of it remains.

References 

Disused railway stations in Berkshire
Railway stations opened by British Rail
Railway stations in Great Britain opened in 1954
Railway stations in Great Britain closed in 1965
Beeching closures in England
1954 establishments in England
1965 disestablishments in England